Chionodes sagayica is a moth in the family Gelechiidae. It is found in Russia. The Global Lepidoptera Names Index has this species as a synonym of Chionodes fumatella.

References

Chionodes
Moths described in 1986
Moths of Asia